Pat Oleszko (born Patricia Oleszko; 1947) is an American visual and performing artist.

Oleszko is from Detroit, Michigan, U.S. In 1970, she earned a Bachelor of Fine Arts degree from the University of Michigan in Ann Arbor.

In 1976, she was artist-in-residence at Artpark, Lewiston, New York. In 1990, she was awarded the Guggenheim Foundation fellowship.

References

External links
 Official website

American performance artists
Artists from Detroit
University of Michigan alumni
Living people
1947 births